Datuk M. Karathu (born 23 February 1943) is a Malaysian football manager and former player.

Career as player
He was a former player for Perak FA in the 1960s to 1970s and won two Malaysia Cup. He also has played for Malaysia national football team.

Career as coach
He started his coaching career in 1971, winning Burnley Cup (the precursor to Razak Cup) with Perak under-20 team. He also has coached the Kinta Indian Association (KIA) team in the FAM Cup.

Karathu have been at the helm of Negeri Sembilan FA, Perak FA in three stints, Malaysia national under-21 football team, winning 1991 TAAN Cup invitation tournament in Nepal with Malaysia B team, Woodlands Wellington FC in Singapore, and Sri Lanka national football team. By coaching Sri Lanka, he was one of a few Malaysians to coach a foreign national team.

As head coach, his success at club level includes winning the first ever FA Cup for Perak over the fancied Selangor team in 1990. In 2001, he coached Perak to the finals of the Malaysia Cup. He also guided Kelantan to the semi-finals of Malaysia Cup in 1993. In 2011, he guided Kelantan to win the Sultan Haji Ahmad Shah Cup title and 2011 Super League Malaysia championship.

Karathu resigned as head coach of Kelantan, ending his second spell with the East Coast team in 2011, after failing to defend their 2010 Malaysia Cup title by losing to Terengganu FA in the quarter-finals of the 2011 Malaysia Cup tournament.

In December 2014, Karathu returned for the fourth time to coach Perak after the previous coach Vjeran Simunic was sacked less than 2 months after taking charge. Under his guidance Perak were briefly topping the league in the early stages, but after poor performances in the later stages of the league, Karathu was relieved of his position in early August 2015.

References

External links
 
 http://theredchannel.com.my/index.php?option=com_k2&view=item&id=18:profil-m-karathu&Itemid=80
 https://web.archive.org/web/20110816140139/http://football.thestar.com.my/story.asp?file=%2F2011%2F1%2F28%2Ffootball_latest%2F7886222&sec=football_latest

1943 births
Living people
Malaysian football managers
Perak F.C. players
Singapore Premier League head coaches
Woodlands Wellington FC head coaches
Expatriate football managers in Sri Lanka
Sri Lanka national football team managers
Malaysian people of Tamil descent
Malaysian sportspeople of Indian descent
Perak F.C. managers
Malaysian footballers
Malaysia international footballers
Association footballers not categorized by position